Elisha Porat (June 25, 1938 - March 24, 2013) was a Hebrew poet and writer.

From 1973, Elisha Porat published 19 volumes of Hebrew fiction and poetry. In 1996, he was awarded Israel's Prime Minister's Prize for Literature. His works have appeared in translation in Israel, the United States, Canada and England. The English translation of his short stories collection "The Messiah of LaGuardia",  was released in 1997. The English translation of his second stories collection "PAYBACK", was published in 2002. His novel, Episode, was published in 2006.

References

External links
 Elisha Porat's books list at the national library in Jerusalem, Israel.
 An English interview with the Hebrew poet Elisha Porat
 Another English interview with the Hebrew poet Elisha Porat
Elisha Porat's page at the ITHL catalog.

1938 births
20th-century Israeli poets
Israeli male poets
2013 deaths
20th-century male writers
Recipients of Prime Minister's Prize for Hebrew Literary Works